The Palacio del Obispado, Spanish for Bishop's Palace, is located in Monterrey, Nuevo León state, Northeastern Mexico. It contains a museum.

The Palace was constructed on the slopes of a hill, later named Cerro del Obispado (Bishop Hill) after its principal building.

Architecture

The Bishop's Palace was built in the Spanish colonial Baroque style. The domed tower has a carved stone facade. 

It is one of the city's oldest buildings, completed by the end of the 18th century.

See also
Roman Catholic Archdiocese of Monterrey

External links

Buildings and structures in Monterrey
History museums in Mexico

Landmarks in Monterrey
National Monuments of Mexico
Tourist attractions in Monterrey
Baroque palaces in Mexico
Spanish Colonial architecture in Mexico